The Myanmar Farmers Development Party is a political party in Myanmar (Burma). The party claims to have a membership of 2 million people, and had 286 candidates in the 2015 general election.

The party campaigns on supporting farmers in Myanmar, being focused on modernizing and expanding the agricultural sector of Myanmar. The party also supports creating a peaceful end to the civil war in the country.

References 

Political parties in Myanmar
Political parties established in 2012
2012 establishments in Myanmar